Albert Cornelius Knudson (1873–1953) was a Christian theologian in the Methodist tradition, associated with Boston University and the school of liberal theology known as Boston personalism.

Biography
Albert Cornelius Knudson was born on January 23, 1873, in Grand Meadow, Minnesota. He was the son of Asle Knudson (1844-1939) and Synnove (Fosse) Knudsen (1842-1916), both of whom were immigrants from Norway. The family subsequently moved to Saint Paul, Minnesota. Asle Knudson regularly traveled by train to Grand Meadow to minister at the Danish-Norwegian Methodist Church until shortly before his death in 1939.

Albert Knudson studied at the University of Minnesota, Minneapolis (AB 1893) and Boston University (STB 1896, Ph.D. 1900). He attended Jena University and Berlin University (honorary Th.D. 1923). After teaching briefly at the University of Denver and Baker University, Baldwin City, Kansas,  and at Allegheny College, Meadville, Pennsylvania, he began his long career in Boston University where he later became dean of the Boston University School of Theology (1926-1938).

Personal life
Albert Knudson was married to Mathilde Johnson (1872–1948) in 1899. He died on August 28, 1953, at his home in Cambridge, Massachusetts.

Selected works
The Old Testament Problem (1908)
Present Tendencies in Religious Thought (1924)
The Philosophy of Personalism: A Study in the Metaphysics of Religion (1927)
The Beacon Lights of Prophecy: An Interpretation of Amos Hosea, Isiah, Jeremiah, Ezekiel and Deutero-Isiah (1929)
The Doctrine of God (1930)
The Doctrine of Redemption (1933)
The Validity of Religious Experience (The Fondren lectures) (1937)
The Principles of Christian Ethics (1943)
Personalism in Theology with Edgar Sheffield Brightman (1943)
Basic Issues in Christian Thought (1950)

References

Other sources
Deats, Paul  (Ed.) (1986) The Boston Personalist Tradition  (Mercer University Press) 
Brightman, Edgar Sheffield  (1979)  Personalism in Theology: a Symposium in Honor of Albert Cornelius Knudson by Associates and Former Students (New York: AMS Press. reprint of the 1943 ed. published by Boston University Press)

External links
Albert C. Knudson portrait (1896)

1873 births
1954 deaths
20th-century American theologians
20th-century Methodists
American Christian theologians
Methodists from Minnesota
American people of Norwegian descent
Boston University School of Theology alumni
Boston University School of Theology faculty
Methodist theologians
People from Mower County, Minnesota
Systematic theologians
University of Minnesota alumni
American university and college faculty deans